Raksha is a 1982 Hindi-language spy film, produced by P. Mallikharjuna Rao on Bharathi International Films banner and directed by Ravikant Nagaich. Starring Jeetendra and Parveen Babi, with music composed by R. D. Burman. The film is remake of Telugu film Rahasya Gudachari (1981).

Plot
The film begins with India entering its atomic age and Prof. Srivastava succeeds in his nuclear test. Being cognizant of it, a terrorist organization led by a monster Big Hardy establishes his base camp in India. He alerts his internal command Daulatram, a traitor who forges as honorable, to kill Srivastava. The conversation is overheard by his employee Kedar Babu; hence he is slain. Moreover, his daughter Chanda is abducted and hypnotized and she turns into Bijli. Now, Srivastava is killed in a dreadful plane crash which raises mayhem in the country. During that plight, the Govt decides to entrust the case to Secret Agent 116, Gopal Kishan Pandey. Snitching it, the malefactors' intrigue when, tragically, his wife Aasha dies. Here, avenged Agent 116 immediately, takes the charge, and starts his investigation when the only clue he acquires is the phone number of Bijli. Then, he chases her, and discovers the nefarious shade of Daulatram, and also their conspiracy to destroy the atomic power station. However, Gopal breaks down their plan and retrieves Chanda's memory, when they fall in love. Further, he places her as his squealer in the foes camp. After a while, Gopal succeeds in identifying the exact location of the enemies' surface camp in the Himalayan range and after making an adventurous journey he lands therein. At that point, he notices powerful nuclear missiles are targeted toward the country for wreaking havoc. At last, Agent 116 lion-heartedly encounters Die Hard, ceases him, and tears down his operation. Finally, the movie ends on a happy note with the marriage of Gopal and Chanda.

Cast
Jeetendra as Gopal Kishan Pandey / Agent 116
Parveen Babi as Chanda / Bijli
Moushumi Chatterjee as Asha
Prem Chopra as Big Hardy
Ranjeet as Daulatram
Suresh Oberoi as Dr. Sinha
Satyendra Kapoor as Dr. Srivastava
Iftekhar as Chief of Secret Services
Manik Irani as Francis
Goga Kapoor as Khurana
Narendra Nath as Jagat Baba
Paintal as Goga
Sajjan as Kedar, Chanda’s father
Agha as Chef
Birbal as Chef
Polson as Chef 
Praveen Kumar as Daulatram's Henchman

Soundtrack 
Lyrics: Anand Bakshi

References

External links
 

1982 films
1980s Hindi-language films
Indian spy action films
Films scored by R. D. Burman
Hindi remakes of Telugu films
Films directed by Ravikant Nagaich